The Negarestan Palace (Persian: کاخ نگارستان) or the Negarestan Garden (Persian: باغ نگارستان) is a historic building in Tehran, Iran. It was built as a summer residence by the order of Fathali Shah Qajar in 1807.

Name 
It is called Negarestan due to the point that in one of the rooms of the palace a large number of paintings, mostly portraits, were on display. Negar(Persian: نگار) means "Picture", "image" or "Painting", and as such Negarestan means "Place of paintings".

History 
After the death of Fathali Shah Qajar, Mohammad Shah Qajar had his coronation in the Negarestan Palace. It was also in this place that Qaem Maqam Farahani was killed by the orders of Mohammad Shah. For a while it was used as an agriculture school, School of fine arts, and even served as the seat for the ministry of justice.

Jean-Baptiste Feuvrier, Nasereddin Shah Qajar's personal physician, writes about how a camel was sacrificed on Eid al Adha in Negarestan every year.

Gallery

See also
Naser al-Din Shah's slide

References 

Palaces in Iran
Royal residences in Iran
Buildings of the Qajar period
19th-century establishments in Iran